Jacques Cartier Monument is the English name of various monuments to the French explorer:

 Saint Henri Square, Montreal
 Cartier-Brébeuf National Historic Site, Quebec City
 George Bareau, sculptor, Saint-Malot, France